Bai or baisaheb is a suffix added to the name of female members of the Hindu dynasties.e.g. Shantabai It is also used as an honorific for the elder sister amongst the Marathi-speaking people. This type of suffix is also used in several warrior castes and in some of the tribal castes, for example the Lambadi.

References

Suffixes
Indian words and phrases